Bipop Carire S.p.A. was an Italian banking group based in Brescia, Lombardy. The group became part of Capitalia in 2002. Capitalia itself became part of UniCredit in 2007, which the brand Bipop Carire was absorbed into UniCredit in 2008. Bipop Carire was formed as a merger of Banca Popolare di Brescia (Bipop) and Cassa di Risparmio di Reggio Emilia (Carire) in 1999.

Fineco was a subsidiary of the group.

History
Bipop–Carire was a merger of Cassa di Risparmio di Reggio Emilia (Carire, found 1494) and Banca Popolare di Brescia (Bipop, found 1983 by the merger of Banca Popolare di Lumezzane and Banca Popolare di Palazzolo) in 1999. It was listed in Borsa Italiana (Milan Stock Exchange). However the group suffered from a false account scandal in 2001, which the group was then merged with Banca di Roma to form Capitalia in 2002. After the merger, Bipop Carire still operated as a brand and division of Capitalia.

However, in 2008 Capitalia was acquired by UniCredit and the banking group ceased to use the brand Bipop-Carire. 4 former Bipop-Carire branches were sold to fellow Italian bank Banca Carige. The rest of the retail branches were received by the sister companies UniCredit Banca (Northern Italy) and Banca di Roma (Central-South Italy).

Sponsorship
The group was a sponsor of Pallacanestro Reggiana.

References

Further reading

External links
 

Capitalia Group
Banks established in 1999
Italian companies established in 1999
Banks disestablished in 2008
Italian companies disestablished in 2008
Defunct banks of Italy
Companies based in Brescia
Former UniCredit subsidiaries